Two train ferries have been named Essex Ferry.

, in service 1947–56
, in service 1957–81

Ship names